Hughes Springs Independent School District is a public school district located in Hughes Springs, Texas (USA).

Located in Cass County, a small portion of the district extends into Morris County, including some of the city of Lone Star

In 2009, the school district was rated "academically acceptable" by the Texas Education Agency.

Schools 
 Hughes Springs High School (Grades 9-12)
 Hughes Springs Junior High School (Grades 6-8)
 Hughes Springs ElementarySchool (Grades PK-5)
 2000-01 National Blue Ribbon School

References

External links 
 Hughes Springs ISD

School districts in Cass County, Texas
School districts in Morris County, Texas